Lin Jun (born July 1949) is a Chinese politician who served as president of the Central Committee of the All-China Federation of Returned Overseas Chinese from 2008 to 2017.

He was a representative of the 16th and 17th National Congress of the Chinese Communist Party. He was an alternate member of the 17th Central Committee of the Chinese Communist Party and a member of the 18th Central Committee of the Chinese Communist Party.

Biography
Lin was born in Dutch East Indies (now Indonesia) in July 1949, while his ancestral home in Anxi County, Fujian, China.

He once served as director and then deputy secretary-general of the General Office of the State Planning Commission, and general manager of China Grain Reserves Corporation.

In July 2004, he became the deputy present of the Central Committee of the All-China Federation of Returned Overseas Chinese, rising to president in January 2008.

References

1949 births
Living people
Chinese diaspora
Indonesian people of Chinese descent
People's Republic of China politicians from Fujian
Chinese Communist Party politicians from Fujian
Alternate members of the 17th Central Committee of the Chinese Communist Party
Members of the 18th Central Committee of the Chinese Communist Party